The Women's doubles squash competitions at the 2022 Commonwealth Games in Birmingham, England took place between August 4th and 8th at the University of Birmingham Hockey and Squash Centre. A total of 38 competitors from 14 nations took part.

Schedule
The schedule was as follows:

Results
The draw is as follows:

Finals

Top half

Bottom half

References

External link
Results
 

Squash at the 2022 Commonwealth Games